The 1932 Liège–Bastogne–Liège was the 22nd edition of the Liège–Bastogne–Liège cycle race and was held on 5 May 1932. The race started and finished in Liège. The race was won by Marcel Houyoux.

General classification

References

1932
1932 in Belgian sport